The Tenpin Bowling Proprietors Association (TBPA) is the trade association for the Ten-pin bowling industry in Great Britain.BALPPA http://www.balppa.org/wp-content/uploads/2016/07/BALPPA-WELCOMES-THE-TEMPIN-BOWLING-PROPRIETORS-ASSOCIATION-AS-MEMBERS.pdf Formed in 1961, along with the British Tenpin Bowling Association, it was formed as an umbrella organisation. It aims to represent the interests of its member companies, including equipment suppliers and operators in tenpin bowling, and has over 40 members who are responsible for approximately 150 bowling centres in the country.  The group works publicly and privately to raise the profile of tenpin bowling.

The TBPA works closely with local and national government and independent organisations, offering advice and information to help its members comply with law and regulations.  It also aims to encourage high standards of business practice through a voluntary code of practice.

References

External links
Official website of the TBPA and Go Tenpin is a division of the TBPA and the chosen name for the website.

Tenpin bowling in the United Kingdom
Sports organisations of the United Kingdom
Trade associations based in the United Kingdom